University of Science and Technology of Hanoi (USTH) (also called Vietnam France University) is an International Standard Public University in Hanoi founded in 2009 under the Intergovernmental Agreement between Vietnam and France signed on 12 November 2009.

Introduction 
As a public university modeled according to international standards, USTH is being built with funds from the Government of Viet Nam and a strong support from the French Government, Vietnam Academy of Science and Technology (VAST), Asian Development Bank and the USTH Consortium of 42 universities and research organizations of France.

USTH is one of the four public universities under Ministry of Education and Training with the aim that USTH will be a university which can meet strict international standards. The university applies new teaching methods, which are based on student self-sufficiency, initiative, teamwork and practical experiments. The advanced training programs are strongly associated with research activities and a strong connection with leading companies in Vietnam.

History 
In June 2008,  Deputy Prime Ministry Cum Minister for Education and Training, Nguyen Thien Nhan and the Ministry for French Higher Education and Research, Valérie Pécresse have decided to choose France as the foreign strategic partner of University of Science and Technology of Hanoi (USTH). This project was funded by the Asian Development Bank.

According to the Decision No. 2067 of Prime Minister of the Socialist Republic of Vietnam on 9 December 2009, USTH was established and built within the campus of Hoa Lac Hi-tech Park. This is part of a project which aims to establish an international public school which follows a modern framework. Also, the Government of Vietnam will co-operate with other foreign partners to build a network of international public schools in Hanoi, Can Tho, Ho Chi Minh City, and Da Nang.

There were six training programs when the university was established:

 Pharmacological and Agronomical Biotechnology (PAB)
 Bachelor in Space and Applications (SA)
 Energy (EN)
 Information and Communication Technology (ICT)
 Advanced Materials Science and Nanotechnology (AMSN)
 Water - Environment - Oceanography (WEO)

On 10 November 2011, there was a signing ceremony between Asian Development Bank and the State Bank of Vietnam to accept the $190 million to build new USTH's campus in Hoa Lac, Hanoi.

USTH welcomed the first Vietnamese students who were trained in France to become USTH lectures, researchers in December 2009.

In the academic field, the first bachelor and master programs in Advanced Materials Science and Nanotechnology (AMSN), and Pharmacological and Agronomical Biotechnology (PAB) began in October 2010. The first master program in Space and Applications (SA) and first Ph.D. program started in October 2012 and August 2014, respectively.

To support comprehensive training and research, USTH established The PLMCC (Product Lifecycle Competency Centre) in June 2014. Four months later, three joint international research units were established such as Water - Environment - Oceanography Department;  Clean Energy and Sustainable Development Laboratory (Clean-ED); Information, Communication and Technology Laboratory (ICTLab). Currently, there are six international joint laboratories at USTH.

In October 2018, the Prime Minister issued Decision No. 1434/QD-TTg approving adjustments to the policy of USTH project of establishing at Hoa Lac Hi-Tech Park. According to the decision, the new campus of USTH within the area of 65ha will have classrooms and laboratories at international standards for the activities of learning and scientific research of the lecturers, researchers and students. The project is expected to be completed by 2023.

On 18 March 2016, USTH was transferred to the VAST, following the decision made by the Prime Minister. This decision was taken to help scientists and other institutes of VAST to actively contribute to the training of USTH students and the development of research.

Organization 
 USTH Council 
 Rector
 Science and Education Council
 Research and Education Departments
 Undergraduate School
 Master and Doctoral School
 Direction of Research, Innovation and Technology Transfer (DRITT)
 Administrative Units

Cabinet 
Principal Rector: Prof. Jean-Marc Lavest 

Rector: Assoc. Prof. Dinh Thi Mai Thanh

Vice-Rector:
Dr. Nguyen Hai Dang

Training programs 
USTH offers training programs at three levels: Bachelor, Master and Ph.D. USTH is the first University in Asia to follow the Bologna process for Diploma (LMD system 3/5/8), the model is widely used in most of the universities in Europe. The training duration of Bachelor is three years, Master is two years and Ph.D. is three years.

All courses are given in English. The quality of training programs has been recognized by the HCERES (The High Council for Evaluation of Research and Higher Education in France) in March 2017. The well-structured Bachelor program at USTH is built based on the European Credit Transfer and Accumulation System (ECTS), which bring favorable conditions for students if they want to study abroad.

In master programs, USTH cooperates with French universities in USTH Consortium to co-accredit the international diplomas. The graduates will receive the dual diplomas from USTH and French universities.

Bachelor programs 
The Bachelor program will be taught in three years, based on the European Credit Transfer and Accumulation System (ECTS) as in most of the European countries, equivalent to 180 Credits.

To open more opportunities to the high school students with great passion in science and technology but encounter the English barrier can pursue their study at USTH, from the academic year 2018–2019, USTH starts English supporting programs, with 700 intensive hours of English communication and science, which will provide the students with the necessary English skills to enter 3 year bachelor program without any hiccups. Three-year bachelor programs include a foundation year and two 2 specialized years.

USTH offers 16 training fields based on the needs of Vietnam's science and technology development.

 Bachelor in Advanced Materials Science and Nanotechnology (AMSN)
Bachelor in Aeronautical Engineering
Bachelor in Applied Environmental Sciences
Bachelor in Applied Mathematics
Bachelor in Automotive Engineering
Bachelor in Biotechnology – Drug Discovery
 Bachelor in Chemistry
 Bachelor in Cyber Security
 Bachelor in Data Science
 Bachelor in Electrical Engineering and Renewable Energy
 Bachelor in Engineering Physics and Electronics
 Bachelor in Food Science and Technology (FST)
 Bachelor in Information and Communication Technology
 Bachelor in Mechatronics Engineering Technology
Bachelor in Medical Science and Technology (MST)
 Bachelor in Space Science and Satellite Technology

The Aeronautics program is designed based on the comprehensive support of Vietnam Aviation Corporation or Vietnam Airlines, Vietnam Airlines Engineering Company (VAECO), Airbus Cooperation,  French Civil Aviation University or École nationale de l'aviation civile (ENAC) and Institut aéronautique et spatial (IAS).

With the participation of European trainers, the program, which consists of 30 months of theory and practice, focuses on Aircraft and System Maintenance, Technological Support and Control, Aircraft Condition and Quality as aviation operation.

Students do a six-month internship with modern equipment at VAECO. Students can choose two directions when they enter their third year of training: 1) Getting B1/B2 aircraft maintenance certificates issued by the Civil Aviation Authority of Vietnam 2) Studying further about aeronautical engineering development and research.

Each year 30 students from the Bachelor program in Aeronautical Engineering at USTH will be employed by Vietnam Airlines or VAECO for the first five- year phase of agreement from 2018 to 2023.

In 2022, USTH reached a consensus with French universities within the USTH Consortium to launch 3 double-degree programs: Biotechnology – Drug discovery, Information and Communication Technology, and Chemistry. Students will start their study for the first two years at USTH, then transfer to our French partner university to complete their 3rd year. Upon graduation, students will be granted two degrees, one of which the student will receive a degree from USTH and the other from a French partner university, respectively.

Master's programs 
The fields of master programs are:

 Master in Advanced Materials Science and Nanotechnology (AMSN)
 Master in Medical biotechnology - Plant biotechnology - Pharmacology
 Master in Water- Environment- Oceanography (WEO)
 Master in Information and Communication Technology (ICT)
 Master in Space
 Master in Energy (ENG)
 Master in Quantitative Computational Finance (QCF)
 Master of Science Aeronautics and Space - International Air Transport Operations Management

USTH teaching methods are based on high level of hands-on practices, and internships in research and development laboratories or in industrial enterprises in Vietnam and abroad. The pedagogic teams of USTH are 100% composed of international and Vietnamese Professors and Doctors with international teaching experience. The official language used in teaching at USTH is English.

The graduates receive dual diplomas issued by USTH and one French partner university in USTH Consortium.

Ph.D. programs 
The programs offered by the Doctoral school (DS) correspond to the scientific fields covered by the laboratories at the USTH. This allows young researchers, in addition to their research work in the laboratories, to approach the higher level of scientific training and to make an excellent preparation for their future professional life.

Ph.D. specialties 
 Phrmacological, Medical and Agronomical Biotechnology (PMAB)
 Advanced Materials Science and Nanotechnology (AMSN)
 Water-Environment-Oceanography (WEO)
 Information and Communication Technology (ICT)
 Energy (EN)
 Space and Applications (SA)

Lectures 
Starting in 2009, with the guidance and support of the Ministry of Education and Training and the French Embassy in Vietnam, the university sent its first PhD students to study at universities and research institutes under the USTH Consortium, under the 322 program and the 911 projects.

One-hundred percent of USTH lecturers are at least in Ph.D. level with excellent experiences. Every year, USTH welcomes more than 200 foreign lecturers and researchers from France, Japan, South Korea, Thailand... to teach, research, organize seminars and scientific workshops.

Training methods 
USTH applies learner-centered learning principle, encouraging autonomy, initiative, teamwork, and independence of the students.

USTH provides the best conditions for students to study, practice and do research. It has international standardized laboratories and modern facilities. In 2017, the Francophone University Association (AUF) agreed to fund 50.000 Euros for USTH to build USTH Fablab, an open space for creativity.

USTH students have opportunities to participate in research projects with lecturers, seminars, domestic and international workshops to enrich the scientific knowledge and developing the soft skills.

On the other hand, USTH provides professional training courses (ex, 3D design and simulation). After completing the courses, the students will be granted a certificate that is widely recognized by specialized companies such as Dassault Systèmes). The school with large companies in Vietnam also offers training courses, and career orientation to help students to be more confident with their future career options.

Research activities 
So far, USTH had built six international joint labs with cooperation with over 40 leading institutes and universities of USTH Consortium in France, as the following:
International mixed laboratory "Drug resistance in Southeast Asia" - LMI DRISA
Hanoi International Laboratory for Oceanographic Research - HILO
International mixed laboratory for functional genetics, biotechnology and associated microorganisms - LMI RICE
International mixed Laboratory of Information Technology and Communications - ICTLab
International mixed laboratory "Clean energy and Sustainable development" - CleanED
International Mixed Laboratory Combined Systems Ground - Ocean - Atmosphere - LMI LOTUS

In addition, the university's research projects have received funding from the French Embassy in Vietnam, USTH Consortium, European Climate Fund, Wellcome Trust Fund - United Kingdom, Embassy of Ireland.

Also in 2017, USTH was listed in the top ten universities and research institutes with the most high quality international scientific publications in Vietnam ranked by Nature Index.

Moreover, USTH is constantly promoting cooperation with universities and research institutes in developed countries such as France, USA, Japan, Korea and Singapore to bring opportunities in academic exchanges, cooperation in research projects, and co-organizing international scientific seminars for lecturers, researchers and students of the university.

In March 2018, USTH hosted the 19th International Conference on Computational Linguistics and Intelligent Text Processing (CICLing 2018). This is one of the annual international conferences, attracting outstanding scientists and hundreds of researchers in the field of computational language and information processing throughout the world. In 2017, CICLing was ranked 20th in the list of the most prestigious seminars and journals in Computational Linguistics by Google Scholar.

Domestic and international partnership 
Since its establishment in 2009, the university has developed the close relationships with local and international partners to provide students with opportunities for study and internship. USTH's partner network is constantly expanding from universities, research institutes, NGOs to businesses in the field of science and technology in Vietnam and the developed countries like France, USA, Ireland and Italy, Japan, South Korea, Taiwan.

Moreover, the USTH received strong support from USTH Consortium, including more than 40 universities and research institutes in France (USTH Consortium) in many aspects such as developing training programs, sending lectures to teach at USTH, support and facilitate USTH students to do an internship in France.

Internship opportunities 
On average, 70 percent of USTH final year students and graduate students have the opportunity to practice at more than 200 universities, research institutes, and laboratories in 20 countries leading in science and technology such as England, France, USA, Korea, Japan, Thailand, Taiwan, etc.

USTH annually grants a full scholarship to 10 percent of the third-year students to go France for internships.

Scholarship 
USTH has various scholarships for registering candidates who have achieved national and international awards during their high-school period and for students pursuing a USTH's program who had good to excellent academic results. Students under challenging living circumstances and who are in remote areas will be eligible to apply for financial aid supported by USTH.

The annual USTH scholarships are prioritized for the disabled, the ethnic minority, and female students. The school allows candidates to choose only one scholarship with the highest value when they are also qualified for other external scholarships.

References

External links  
 
 USTH Consortium website: http://www.consortium-usth.org/
 http://about.cleaned-usth.com/
 http://en.vietnam.ird.fr/our-partners/vietnamese-partners/usth
 http://www.vast.ac.vn/en/news/activities/1793-signing-ceremony-between-usth-and-vietnam-airlines
 http://www.en.bienvenueenfrance-vietnam.com/ees/univ/USTH
 https://www.natureindex.com/institution-outputs/vietnam/university-of-science-and-technology-of-hanoi-usth/56ea090a140ba038668b4569

Universities in Hanoi